Nevertheless may refer to any of the following and more:

 Nevertheless (album), an album by Christine Fellows
 Nevertheless (band), an American Christian indie pop rock band
 "Nevertheless I'm in Love with You", a song written by Harry Ruby
 Nevertheless (TV series), a 2021 South Korean television series

See also